Muellerella lecanactidis is a species of lichenicolous (lichen-dwelling) fungus in the family Verrucariaceae. It was formally described as a new species in 2003 by Paul Diederich and Pieter van den Boom, from specimens collected in California. The authors thought that the type specimen was parasitising a lichen from genus Lecanactis, hence the species epithet, but it was later discovered that the host was actually Sigridea californica.

References

Verrucariales
Fungi described in 2003
Fungi of the United States
Lichenicolous fungi